Paul Kind (born 8 February 1950) is a former Liechtenstein cyclist. He competed in the individual road race at the 1972 Summer Olympics.

References

External links
 

1950 births
Living people
Liechtenstein male cyclists
Olympic cyclists of Liechtenstein
Cyclists at the 1972 Summer Olympics
Place of birth missing (living people)